The 26th Chess Olympiad (I 26i Skakistikí Olympiáda), organized by FIDE and comprising an open and a women's tournament, as well as several other events designed to promote the game of chess, took place between November 18 and December 5, 1984, in Thessaloniki, Greece.

In the home country of the Olympic movement, it was business as usual. The Soviet Union, led by Beliavsky, won their third consecutive gold medals (and 15th in total), well ahead of England (helped by a Nunn in top form) and the United States. This dominance happened even in the absence of Karpov and Kasparov who were in the midst of their marathon match. In fact, for the first time in Olympic history, the Soviet team didn't feature a single world champion – past, present or future.

The only champion present in Thessaloniki was Boris Spassky who had defected and now represented France. His performance helped the French team to an unprecedented 7th-place finish, even though he drew 12 of his 14 games – an Olympic record.

After the successful 26th Olympiad in Thessaloniki in 1984, FIDE agreed to hold every other Olympiad (the ones in Olympic years) in the home country of the Olympic movement - provided the Greek Chess Federation and government could provide the necessary funding. This was only the case once, in 1986; after that the Olympiad went back to a new host city every two years.

Open event

There were 87 nations playing in a 14-round Swiss system tournament. To make for an even number of teams, the Greek hosts also fielded a "B" team. In the event of a draw, the tie-break was decided first by using the Buchholz system, then by match points.

{| class="wikitable"
|+ Open event
! # !! Country !! Players !! Averagerating !! Points
|-
| style="background:gold;"|1 ||  || Beliavsky, Polugaevsky, Vaganian, Tukmakov, Yusupov, Sokolov || 2610 || 41
|-
| style="background:silver;"|2 ||  || Miles, Nunn, Speelman, Chandler, Mestel, Short || 2556 || 37
|-
| style="background:#cc9966;"|3 ||  || Dzindzichashvili, Kavalek, Christiansen, Browne, Alburt, De Firmian || 2553 || 35
|}
{| class="wikitable collapsible collapsed"
! # !! Country !! Averagerating !! Points !! Buchholz
|-
| 4 ||  || 2596 || 34½ || 
|-
| 5 ||  || 2470 || 33 || 
|-
| 6 ||  || 2516 || 32½ || 445.0
|-
| 7 ||  || 2485 || 32½ || 442.0
|-
| 8 ||  || 2561 || 32 || 457.5
|-
| 9 ||  || 2470 || 32 || 447.5
|-
| 10 ||  || 2574 || 32 || 446.0
|-
| 11 ||  || 2473 || 32 || 444.5
|-
| 12 ||  || 2433 || 32 || 429.0
|-
| 13 ||  || 2468 || 32 || 425.5
|-
| 14 ||  || 2401 || 32 || 423.5
|-
| 15 ||  || 2514 || 31½ || 450.0
|-
| 16 ||  || 2426 || 31½ || 425.0
|-
| 17 ||  || 2555 || 31 || 435.0
|-
| 18 ||  || 2458 || 31 || 420.5
|-
| 19 ||  || 2410 || 31 || 418.5
|-
| 20 ||  || 2423 || 31 || 412.0
|-
| 21 ||  || 2449 || 30½ || 418.0
|-
| 22 ||  || 2426 || 30½ || 416.0
|-
| 23 ||  || 2423 || 30½ || 412.0
|-
| 24 ||  || 2325 || 30½ || 403.0
|-
| 25 ||  || 2503 || 30 || 454.5
|-
| 26 ||  || 2409 || 30 || 431.0
|-
| 27 ||  || 2451 || 30 || 430.5
|-
| 28 ||  || 2406 || 30 || 421.0
|-
| 29 ||  || 2398 || 30 || 413.0
|-
| 30 ||  || 2438 || 30 || 411.5
|-
| 31 ||  || 2399 || 30 || 408.0
|-
| 32 ||  || 2349 || 30 || 407.5
|-
| 33 ||  || 2409 || 29½ || 420.0
|-
| 34 ||  || 2365 || 29½ || 396.0
|-
| 35 ||  || 2286 || 29½ || 389.5
|-
| 36 ||  || 2313 || 29½ || 382.0
|-
| 37 ||  || 2200 || 29½ || 364.0
|-
| 38 ||  || 2380 || 29 || 416.5
|-
| 39 ||  || 2438 || 29 || 416.0
|-
| 40 ||  || 2324 || 29 || 414.5
|-
| 41 ||  || 2333 || 29 || 410.0
|-
| 42 ||  || 2324 || 29 || 407.0
|-
| 43 ||  || 2330 || 29 || 402.0
|-
| 44 ||  || 2293 || 29 || 392.0
|-
| 45 ||  "B" || 2318 || 29 || 379.0
|-
| 46 ||  || 2249 || 28½ || 403.0
|-
| 47 ||  || 2291 || 28½ || 396.5
|-
| 48 ||  || 2278 || 28 || 
|-
| 49 ||  || 2385 || 27½ || 412.5
|-
| 50 ||  || 2285 || 27½ || 401.0
|-
| 51 ||  || 2283 || 27½ || 392.5
|-
| 52 ||  || 2236 || 27½ || 380.5
|-
| 53 ||  || 2255 || 27 || 388.5
|-
| 54 ||  || 2274 || 27 || 375.5
|-
| 55 ||  || 2200 || 27 || 367.0
|-
| 56 ||  || 2230 || 26½ || 395.5
|-
| 57 ||  || 2275 || 26½ || 392.5
|-
| 58 ||  || 2201 || 26½ || 384.5
|-
| 59 ||  || 2226 || 26½ || 368.5
|-
| 60 ||  || 2203 || 26½ || 332.5
|-
| 61 ||  || 2271 || 26 || 389.5
|-
| 62 ||  || 2280 || 26 || 388.5
|-
| 63 ||  || 2229 || 26 || 382.5
|-
| 64 ||  || 2203 || 26 || 370.0
|-
| 65 ||  || 2230 || 26 || 364.0
|-
| 66 ||  || 2226 || 26 || 362.5
|-
| 67 ||  || 2200 || 26 || 355.5
|-
| 68 ||  || 2215 || 25½ || 373.0
|-
| 69 ||  || 2201 || 25½ || 314.0
|-
| 70 ||  || 2234 || 25 || 383.0
|-
| 71 ||  || 2203 || 25 || 368.0
|-
| 72 ||  || 2201 || 25 || 355.0
|-
| 73 ||  || 2200 || 25 || 346.5
|-
| 74 ||  || 2200 || 25 || 326.0
|-
| 75 ||  || 2201 || 25 || 324.5
|-
| 76 ||  || 2203 || 24½ || 351.5
|-
| 77 ||  || 2205 || 24½ || 333.0
|-
| 78 ||  || 2200 || 24 || 355.5
|-
| 79 ||  and  || 2201 || 24 || 352.0
|-
| 80 ||  || 2218 || 24 || 342.0
|-
| 81 ||  || 2203 || 24 || 331.5
|-
| 82 ||  || 2200 || 23½ || 
|-
| 83 ||  || 2215 || 21½ || 
|-
| 84 ||  || 2201 || 21 || 
|-
| 85 ||  || 2208 || 17½ || 
|-
| 86 ||  || 2200 || 17 || 
|-
| 87 ||  || 2200 || 16 || 
|-
| 88 ||  || 2200 || 13 || 
|}

Individual medals

For the first time, in addition to the performance awards on each board, a special award was given to the best overall performance rating.

 Performance rating:  John Nunn 2868
 Board 1:  Craig Van Tilbury 9½ / 11 = 86.4%
 Board 2:  John Nunn 10 / 11 = 90.9%
 Board 3:  Rafael Vaganian 8½ / 10 = 85.0%
 Board 4:  Pricha Sinprayoon 8 / 10 = 80.0%
 1st reserve:  Dewperkash Gajadin,  József Pintér,  Javier Ochoa de Echagüen, and  Jonathan Mestel 7 / 9 = 77.8%
 2nd reserve:   Gorden Comben and  Marios Schinis 7½ / 10 = 75.0%

Women's event

50 nations took part, and with the Greek hosts also fielding a "B" side, the total number of teams came to 51. In the event of a draw, the tie-break was decided first by using the Buchholz system, then by match points.

Like the open event, the women's tournament was dominated by the Soviet Union, captained by world champion Chiburdanidze, who won the gold medals by an impressive 5½ points. Bulgaria and Romania took silver and bronze, respectively.

{| class="wikitable"
! # !! Country !! Players !! Averagerating !! Points
|-
| style="background:gold;"|1 ||  || Chiburdanidze, Levitina, Gaprindashvili, Semenova || 2335 || 32
|-
| style="background:silver;"|2 ||  || Voiska, Gocheva, Chilingirova, Savova || 2105 || 27½
|-
| style="background:#cc9966;"|3 ||  || Mureșan, Polihroniade, Nuțu, Olărașu || 2180 || 27
|}
{| class="wikitable collapsible collapsed"
! # !! Country !! Averagerating !! Points !! Buchholz
|-
| 4 ||  || 2232 || 26 || 340.5
|-
| 5 ||  || 2098 || 26 || 335.0
|-
| 6 ||  || 2218 || 25 || 
|-
| 7 ||  || 2227 || 24½ || 345.5
|-
| 8 ||  || 2137 || 24½ || 336.0
|-
| 9 ||  || 2162 || 24 || 340.5
|-
| 10 ||  || 2055 || 24 || 330.0
|-
| 11 ||  || 2075 || 23½ || 346.5
|-
| 12 ||  || 2072 || 23½ || 316.5
|-
| 13 ||  || 2077 || 23½ || 316.0
|-
| 14 ||  || 2092 || 23½ || 303.0
|-
| 15 ||  || 2143 || 23 || 
|-
| 16 ||  || 2018 || 22½ || 
|-
| 17 ||  || 2020 || 22 || 316.5
|-
| 18 ||  || 1985 || 22 || 308.5
|-
| 19 ||  || 1963 || 22 || 303.5
|-
| 20 ||  || 1908 || 22 || 299.5
|-
| 21 ||  || 1800 || 22 || 250.0
|-
| 22 ||  || 1913 || 21½ || 311.0
|-
| 23 ||  || 1953 || 21½ || 301.5
|-
| 24 ||  || 1855 || 21½ || 288.0
|-
| 25 ||  || 1800 || 21½ || 257.5
|-
| 26 ||  || 1800 || 21½ || 244.5
|-
| 27 ||  || 1988 || 21 || 316.5
|-
| 28 ||  || 1873 || 21 || 301.5
|-
| 29 ||  || 1903 || 21 || 292.5
|-
| 30 ||  || 1893 || 21 || 283.5
|-
| 31 ||  || 1900 || 21 || 281.0
|-
| 32 ||  || 1800 || 21 || 260.5
|-
| 33 ||  || 1855 || 20½ || 300.5
|-
| 34 ||  || 1927 || 20½ || 296.0
|-
| 35 ||  || 1955 || 20½ || 292.0
|-
| 36 ||  "B" || 1853 || 20½ || 269.5
|-
| 37 ||  || 1800 || 20½ || 267.0
|-
| 38 ||  || 1800 || 20½ || 245.0
|-
| 39 ||  || 1820 || 20 || 286.0
|-
| 40 ||  || 1803 || 20 || 226.5
|-
| 41 ||  || 1915 || 19½ || 274.5
|-
| 42 ||  || 1892 || 19½ || 265.0
|-
| 43 ||  || 1800 || 19½ || 218.0
|-
| 44 ||  || 1828 || 18½ || 268.5
|-
| 45 ||  || 1800 || 18½ || 253.0
|-
| 46 ||  || 1800 || 16½ || 
|-
| 47 ||  || 1800 || 15½ || 
|-
| 48 ||  || 1835 || 15 || 
|-
| 49 ||  || 1800 || 10 || 
|-
| 50 ||  || 1800 || 8½ || 
|-
| 51 ||  || 1800 || 3½ || 
|}

Individual medals

 Performance rating:  Lidia Semenova 2505
 Board 1:  Pia Cramling 10½ / 13 = 80.0%
 Board 2:  Céline Roos 9½ / 13 = 73.1%
 Board 3:  Jussara Chaves 9 / 10 = 90.0%
 Reserve:  Lidia Semenova 9½ / 10 = 95.0%

References

26th Chess Olympiad: Thessaloniki 1984 OlimpBase

26
Women's Chess Olympiads
Olympiad 26
Chess Olympiad 26
Olympiad 26
Chess Olympiad 26